The Rhaetian Railway Ge 3/3 is a class of metre gauge 11 kV 16.7 Hz AC electric shunting locomotives operated by the Rhaetian Railway (RhB), which is the main railway network in the Canton of Graubünden, Switzerland.

The class is so named under the Swiss locomotive and railcar classification system. According to that system, Ge 3/3 denotes a narrow gauge electric adhesion locomotive with a total of three axles, all of which are drive axles.  There are only two locomotives in the Ge 3/3 class, and they are numbered 214 and 215.

Delivered by Robert Aebi (Raco) and Brown, Boveri & Cie (BBC), the Ge 3/3s feature some componentry — e.g., traction motor, compressor and vacuum pump — that are the same as the corresponding components in the second series locomotives of the Rhaetian Railway Ge 4/4 II class.

The orange liveried Ge 3/3 locomotives are used at major Rhaetian Railway stations: no 214 in Samedan and no 215 in Chur.

Gallery

See also
 History of rail transport in Switzerland
 Rail transport in Switzerland

References 

 
 
 
 

This article is based upon a translation of the German language version as at January 2010.

Brown, Boveri & Cie locomotives
Co locomotives
Electric locomotives of Switzerland
11 kV AC locomotives
Rhaetian Railway locomotives
Railway locomotives introduced in 1984
Metre gauge electric locomotives